Dhangdev Saiyidan is a town in the Islamabad Capital Territory of Pakistan. It is located at 33° 16' N 73° 24' E with an altitude of 438 metres (1440 feet).

References 

Union councils of Islamabad Capital Territory